Michael Madsen (born September 25, 1958) is an American actor. He collaborated with Quentin Tarantino on each films, including Reservoir Dogs (1992), Kill Bill: Volume 1 (2003), Kill Bill: Volume 2 (2004), The Hateful Eight (2015) and Once Upon a Time in Hollywood (2019).

Madsen starred in other films, such as The Natural (1984), The Doors (1991), Thelma & Louise (1991), Free Willy (1993), Species (1995), Donnie Brasco (1997), Die Another Day (2002), Sin City (2005) and Scary Movie 4 (2006). He also starred in video games, such as Grand Theft Auto III (2001), the Dishonored series (2012–2017) and Call of Duty: Mob of the Dead (2013).

Early life 
Madsen was born on September 25, 1958, in Chicago, Illinois. His mother, Elaine (née Melson), was a filmmaker and author. His father, Calvin Christian Madsen, was a World War II Navy veteran and a firefighter with the Chicago Fire Department. His parents divorced in the 1960s, and his mother left the financial world to pursue a career in the arts, encouraged by film critic Roger Ebert. His siblings are Cheryl Madsen, an entrepreneur, and Academy Award nominee Virginia Madsen. Madsen's paternal grandparents were Danish, while his mother is of English, German, Irish, Native American and Scottish ancestry.

Career 

Madsen began working at the Steppenwolf Theatre Company in Chicago, where he served as an apprentice under John Malkovich and appeared in a production of Of Mice and Men.

His first notable film role was a small part for the science fiction film, WarGames. In Quentin Tarantino's directorial debut film Reservoir Dogs, Madsen played "Mr. Blonde", a cruel criminal. Steve Buscemi received the role of "Mr. Pink", which Madsen wanted because it had more scenes with Harvey Keitel. For Pulp Fiction, Madsen declined the role of Vincent Vega, which went to John Travolta. Madsen starred in Mike Newell's gangster film Donnie Brasco. He once said of these films: "Some of them I'm only in for 10 minutes, but they bought my name, and they bought my face to put on the DVD box with a gun. What people don't always understand is that I established a certain lifestyle for my family back in the days of Species and Mulholland Falls and The Getaway. I wasn't about to move my six kids into a trailer park. So when people offered me work, it wasn't always the best, but I had to buy groceries and I had to put gas in the car."

In Kill Bill, Madsen played assassin Budd, the brother of Bill (David Carradine). The film was released in two parts, Vol. 1 and Vol. 2. In 2004, Tarantino discussed an idea for the film to unite Madsen and Travolta, as The Vega Brothers. In 2007, Tarantino said the film (which he intended to call Double V Vega) was "kind of unlikely now", because of the age of the actors and the onscreen deaths of both characters.

Madsen appeared in Uwe Boll's BloodRayne, a film he described as "an abomination... It's a horrifying and preposterous movie." He won Best Actor awards at the Boston Film Festival and New York International Independent Film and Video Festival for his performance in Strength and Honour. He played himself in the mockumentary Being Michael Madsen. Madsen co-starred in Coma, a Web series on Crackle.

He played Jim Ricker, the old friend of Jack Bauer (Kiefer Sutherland), in the eighth season of 24. Madsen starred in the comedy film Let the Game Begin. On January 5, 2012, he entered the Celebrity Big Brother house, where he finished in 4th place in the final.

In February 2014, he played Las Vegas casino mogul Ted Binion in Josh Evans' film Death in the Desert. The screenplay was written by John Steppling, based on the book Death in the Desert by crime writer Cathy Scott.

In August 2014, he starred in the Kill Bill-themed music video for the song "Black Widow" by Iggy Azalea featuring Rita Ora.

Madsen starred in the ensemble western film The Hateful Eight. He was among a number of people rumored to have leaked the film's script before it was released, causing Tarantino to almost not make the film and eventually rewrite it. It was later revealed Madsen was not responsible for leaking the script. In 2016, he played a dramatized role of former Texas Ranger Phil Ryan in Real Detective on the Investigation Discovery network.

He starred in Vilan Trub's crime drama film The Dirty Kind, which is loosely inspired by Anthony Weiner.

Personal life 
Madsen's first wife was Georganne LaPiere, half-sister of singer and actress Cher. They met in 1983, married in 1984, and divorced two years later.<ref></a></ref>

He was married to Jeannine Bisignano from 1991 to 1995. They have two sons, Christian and Max, who are both actors. 

In 1996, he married DeAnna Morgan. The couple married in Ocho Rios, Jamaica while Madsen was on a break from shooting Donnie Brasco. Together they had three sons, Luke, Calvin and Hudson.

He also has one daughter named Jessica.

On January 25, 2022, it was reported that Michael and DeAnna's son, Hudson, an active U.S. Army Soldier with 2-27IN at Schofield Barracks Hawaii, died by suicide from a self-inflicted gunshot wound. Hudson's godfather was director Quentin Tarantino.

Madsen has a line of hot sauces called American Badass.

Philanthropy 
In 2002, Madsen was presented an award for his work with the Shriners Hospital for Children.

In September 2009, Madsen announced his participation in the 26th annual Love Ride to help raise money for local charities. The charity included celebrities Malcolm Forbes, Peter Fonda, Larry Hagman, Billy Idol and Bruce Springsteen, among others. The event was scheduled for October 25, 2009, but was ultimately canceled due to poor ticket sales and a decline in sponsorship.

In 2016, Madsen hosted the event An Intimate Evening with Michael Madsen to benefit Children's Pediatric Cancer.

Awards 
 Lifetime Achievement Award at Red Hen Press in 2006.
 9th Annual Malibu International Film Festival honored Madsen in April 2008 for his Achievements in the Art of Acting
 Independent Firecracker Award for his book of poetry Burning In Paradise.
 2007 Best Actor Boston Film Festival for Strength and Honour
 2008 Best Actor New York International Independent Film & Video Festival for Strength and Honour.
 Madsen won Ensemble of the Year for The Hateful Eight at the Hollywood Film Awards.

Filmography

References

External links 

 
 
 Guardian Interview
 Michael Madsen interview, 2002

Living people
American male film actors
American male television actors
American male video game actors
American male voice actors
American people of Danish descent
American people of English descent
American people of German descent
American people of Scottish descent
American people of Irish descent
American people who self-identify as being of Native American descent
Evanston Township High School alumni
Male actors from Chicago
Writers from California
Writers from Chicago
1958 births
American people of Scandinavian descent